Cugtun is an endonym that may refer to either of two Yup'ik dialects:
Chevak Cup’ik language, spoken in the Chevak
Nunivak Cup'ig language, spoken in the Nunivak Island